Daisy a Day is the third album by Jud Strunk and was released in 1973.  It reached #18 on U.S. Top Country Albums chart and #138 on the Billboard 200.

The album featured two singles: "Daisy a Day", which reached #4 on the U.S. adult contemporary chart, #14 on the Billboard Hot 100, and #33 on the U.S. country chart, and "Next Door Neighbor's Kid", which reached #22 on the U.S. adult contemporary chart.

Track listing
All songs written by Jud Strunk.
 "Daisy a Day" – 2:48
 "Bill Jones General Store" – 1:44
 "The Runaway" – 2:30
 "The Searchers" – 2:00
 "The Long Ride Home" – 2:46
 "Next Door Neighbor's Kid" – 2:53
 "This House" – 3:00
 "Jacob Brown" – 2:35
 "If I Could Have My Way" – 2:52
 "Farethewell" – 2:24

Personnel
 Mike Curb – producer
Don Costa – producer  (tracks: 1–9), arranger
Jim Vienneau – producer 
Jud Strunk – producer (track 10)

Charts

Singles

References

1973 albums
Albums produced by Mike Curb
Albums produced by Don Costa
MGM Records albums